Musikmesse Frankfurt was an international fair regarding the music industry that took place in Frankfurt am Main, Germany from 1980 until 2019.
In 2012, 68,587 visitors and 1,512 exhibitors from 51 countries were counted. Despite an exhibitor drop to 1,384 in 2013, the number of visitors went up to 70,863. On the fair itself musical instruments, software and hardware from the musical environment and further accessories are being introduced.

History
The fair was first introduced in 1980. It is generally held in the first quarter of the year for four days. The first two days are reserved for the business audience, while the last two days are accessible for everyone.

In 2013, the fair was held from 10 to 13 April. A playable and oversized tuba with a measure of 2,05 metres and weighing of 50 kg was displayed, which was first shown in 2012 in the musical instrument museum in Markneukirchen.

In 2016, the fair took place from 7 to 10 April. For the first time the Musikmesse festival took place in the framework of the Musikmesse. It was spread over Frankfurt's pubs and provided musical entertainment.

Due to the COVID-19 pandemic, the fair was cancelled in 2020 and 2021.  In 2022, the organizers have decided to cancel it for good.

Award shows during the fair
 PRG LEA – Live Entertainment Award
 Frankfurter Musikpreis
 Deutscher Musikinstrumentenpreis
 Musikmesse International Press Award (MIPA) 
 Deutscher Pianistenpreis
 Musikeditionspreis Best Edition 
 PPVMEDIEN Leser-Awards
 Europäischer SchulmusikPreis 2013
 SchoolJam
 www.drums.de Musik Fach-Award

Stages
On the main stage, the Agora Stage, every thirty minutes a new act presents music or product demonstrations on two levels at all days. International artists perform music in all facets.

References

External links

 Official English webpage

Fairs in Germany
Trade fairs in Germany
Music in Frankfurt